Christophe Humbert (born 26 June 1979) is a French judoka.

Achievements

References

External links
 

 Videos on Judovision.org

1979 births
Living people
French male judoka
21st-century French people